Flight 19 was the designation of a group of five General Motors TBM Avenger torpedo bombers that disappeared over the Bermuda Triangle on December 5, 1945, after losing contact during a United States Navy overwater navigation training flight from Naval Air Station Fort Lauderdale, Florida. All 14 airmen on the flight were lost, as were all 13 crew members of a Martin PBM Mariner flying boat that subsequently launched from Naval Air Station Banana River to search for Flight 19. 

A report by Navy investigators concluded that flight leader Lt. Charles C. Taylor mistook small islands offshore for the Florida Keys after his compasses stopped working, resulting in the flight heading over open sea and away from land. The report was later amended by the Navy to read "cause unknown" to avoid blaming Taylor for the loss of five aircraft and 14 men. The report attributed the loss of the PBM aircraft to an explosion in mid-air while searching for the flight.

Navigation training flight 
Flight 19 undertook a routine navigation and combat training exercise in TBM-type aircraft. The assignment was called "Navigation problem No. 1", a combination of bombing and navigation, which other flights had completed or were scheduled to undertake that day. The flight leader was United States Navy Lieutenant Charles Carroll Taylor, who had about 2,500 flying hours, mostly in aircraft of this type, while his trainee pilots each had 300 total, and 60 flight hours in the Avenger. Taylor had completed a combat tour in the Pacific theater as torpedo bomber pilot on the aircraft carrier  and had recently arrived from NAS Miami where he had also been a VTB (torpedo-bombing plane) instructor. The student pilots had recently completed other training missions in the area where the flight was to take place. They were U.S. Marine Captains Edward Joseph Powers and George William Stivers, U.S. Marine Second Lieutenant Forrest James Gerber and USN Ensign Joseph Tipton Bossi.

The aircraft were three TBM-1Cs (BuNo 45714, 'FT3'; BuNo 46325, 'FT81'; BuNo 73209, 'FT117'), one TBM-1E (BuNo 46094, 'FT36'); and one TBM-3 (BuNo 23307, 'FT28'). Each aircraft was a version of the Grumman TBF Avenger, built by General Motors' Eastern Aircraft Division under wartime production license. Under the U.S. Navy aircraft designation system used during World War II, Grumman-built Avengers were designated TBF and GM-built aircraft such as these were designated TBM. Each was fully fueled, and during pre-flight checks, it was discovered they were all missing clocks. Navigation of the route was intended to teach dead reckoning principles, which involved calculating, among other things, elapsed time. The apparent lack of timekeeping equipment was not a cause for concern as it was assumed each man had his own watch. Takeoff was scheduled for 13:45 local time, but the late arrival of Taylor delayed departure until 14:10. Weather at NAS Fort Lauderdale was described as "favorable, sea state moderate to rough". Taylor was supervising the mission, and a trainee pilot had the role of leader out front.
 	
Called "Naval Air Station, Fort Lauderdale, Florida, navigation problem No. 1", the exercise involved three different legs, but the actual flight should have flown four. After take off, they flew on heading 091° (almost due east) for  until reaching Hens and Chickens Shoals, commonly called Chicken Rocks, where low level bombing practice was carried out. The next scheduled turn was to a heading of 241° to fly  at the end of which the exercise was completed and the Avengers would turn left to then return to NAS Ft. Lauderdale.

Radio conversations between the pilots were overheard by base and other aircraft in the area. The practice bombing operation is known to have been carried out because at about 15:00 a pilot requested and was given permission to drop his last bomb. Forty minutes later, another flight instructor, Lieutenant Robert F. Cox in FT-74, who was forming up with his group of students for the same mission, received an unidentified transmission.

An unidentified crew member asked Powers, one of the students, for his compass reading. Powers replied: "I don't know where we are. We must have got lost after that last turn." Cox then transmitted; "This is FT-74, plane or boat calling 'Powers' please identify yourself so someone can help you." The response after a few moments was a request from the others in the flight for suggestions. FT-74 tried again and a man identified as FT-28 (Taylor) came on. "FT-28, this is FT-74, what is your trouble?" "Both of my compasses are out", Taylor replied, "and I am trying to find Fort Lauderdale, Florida. I am over land but it's broken. I am sure I'm in the Keys but I don't know how far down and I don't know how to get to Fort Lauderdale."
 	
FT-74 informed the NAS that aircraft were lost, then advised Taylor to put the sun on his port wing and fly north up the coast to Fort Lauderdale. Base operations then asked if the flight leader's aircraft was equipped with a standard YG (IFF transmitter), which could be used to triangulate the flight's position, but the message was not acknowledged by FT-28. (Later he would indicate that his transmitter was activated.) Instead, at 16:45, FT-28 radioed: "We are heading 030 degrees for 45 minutes, then we will fly north to make sure we are not over the Gulf of Mexico." During this time no bearings could be made on the flight, and IFF could not be picked up. Taylor was told to broadcast on 4805 kHz. This order was not acknowledged so he was asked to switch to 3000 kHz, the search and rescue frequency. Taylor replied – "I cannot switch frequencies. I must keep my planes intact."

At 16:56, Taylor was again asked to turn on his transmitter for YG if he had one. He did not acknowledge but a few minutes later advised his flight "Change course to 090 degrees (due east) for 10 minutes." About the same time someone in the flight said "Dammit, if we could just fly west we would get home; head west, dammit." This difference of opinion later led to questions about why the students did not simply head west on their own. It has been explained that this can be attributed to military discipline.
 	
As the weather deteriorated, radio contact became intermittent, and it was believed that the five aircraft by this point were more than  out to sea east of the Florida peninsula. Taylor radioed "We'll fly 270 degrees west until landfall or running out of gas" and requested a weather check at 17:24.

At 18:04, Taylor radioed to his flight "Holding 270. We didn't fly far enough east; we may as well just turn around and fly east again". By that time, the weather had deteriorated even more and the sun had set. Around 18:20, Taylor's last message was received. (It has also been reported that Taylor's last message was received at 19:04.) He was heard saying "All planes close up tight ... we'll have to ditch unless landfall ... when the first plane drops below 10 gallons [], we all go down together."

PBM-5 (Bureau Number 59225) 

As it became obvious the flight was lost, air bases, aircraft, and merchant ships were alerted. A Consolidated PBY Catalina departed after 18:00 to search for Flight 19 and guide them back if they could be located. US Navy Squadron Training No. 49 PBM-5 BuNo 59225 took off at 19:27 from Naval Air Station Banana River (now Patrick Space Force Base), called in a routine radio message at 19:30 and was never heard from again.

Captain Shonna Stanley reported unsuccessfully searching for survivors through a pool of oil and aviation gasoline. The escort carrier  also reported losing radar contact with an aircraft at the same position and time.

Investigation 
A 500-page Navy board of investigation report published a few months later made several observations:

Flight leader Lt. Charles C. Taylor had mistakenly believed that the small islands he passed over were the Florida Keys, that his flight was over the Gulf of Mexico, and that heading northeast would take them to Florida. It was determined that Taylor had passed over the Bahamas as scheduled, and he did in fact lead his flight to the northeast over the Atlantic. The report noted that some subordinate officers did likely know their approximate position as indicated by radio transmissions stating that flying west would result in reaching the mainland.
As noted in the report Taylor refused to change the radio training frequency to the search and rescue radio frequency (The training frequency was difficult to use because of interference from Cuban radio stations and also a radio carrier wave.)
Taylor was not at fault because the compasses stopped working.
The loss of PBM-5 BuNo 59225 was attributed to an explosion.

This report was subsequently amended "cause unknown" by the Navy after Taylor's mother contended that the Navy was unfairly blaming her son for the loss of five aircraft and 14 men, when the Navy had neither the bodies nor the airplanes as evidence.

Had Flight 19 actually been where Taylor believed it to be, the flight would have made landfall with the Florida coastline within 20 minutes, depending on how far down they were. However, a later reconstruction of the incident showed that the islands visible to Taylor were probably the Bahamas, well northeast of the Keys, and that Flight 19 was exactly where it should have been. The board of investigation found that because of his (dogmatic) belief that he was on a base course toward Florida, Taylor actually guided the flight farther northeast and out to sea. Further, it was general knowledge at NAS Fort Lauderdale that if a pilot ever became lost in the area to fly a heading of 270° (due west). Likewise a rule of thumb was that any pilot who got lost going south would simply turn his plane around with the sun on his larboard side [left] and then following the Florida coast heading North. By the time the flight actually turned west, they were likely so far out to sea they had already passed their aircraft's fuel endurance. This factor combined with bad weather, and the ditching characteristics of the Avenger, meant that there was little hope of rescue, even if they had managed to stay afloat.

It is possible that Taylor overshot Gorda Cay and instead reached another land mass in the southern Abaco Islands. He then proceeded northwest as planned. He fully expected to find the Grand Bahama Island lying in front of him as expected. Instead, he eventually saw a land mass to his right side, the northern part of Abaco Island. Believing that this landmass to his right was the Grand Bahama Island and his compass was malfunctioning, he set a course to what he thought was southwest to head straight back to Fort Lauderdale. However, in reality this changed his course farther northwest, toward open ocean.

To further add to his confusion, he encountered a series of islands north of Abaco Island, which look very similar to the Key West Islands. The control tower then suggested that Taylor's team should fly west, which would have taken them to the landmass of Florida eventually. Taylor headed for what he thought was west, but in reality was northwest, almost parallel to Florida.

After trying that for a while and with no land in sight, Taylor decided that it was impossible for them to fly so far west and not reach Florida. He believed that he might have been near the Key West Islands. What followed was a series of serious conversations between Taylor, his other aircrew and the control tower. Taylor was not sure whether he was near Bahama or Key West, and he was not sure which direction he faced due to compass malfunction. The control tower informed Taylor that he could not be in Key West since the wind that day did not blow that way. Some of the aircrew believed that their compass was working. Taylor then set a course northeast according to their compass, which should take them to Florida if they were in Key West. When that failed, Taylor set a course west according to their compass, which should have taken them to Florida if they were in Bahama. If Taylor stayed this course he would have reached land before running out of fuel. However, at some point Taylor decided that he had tried going west enough. He then once again set a course northeast, thinking they were near Key West after all. Finally, his flight ran out of fuel and may have crashed into the ocean somewhere north of Abaco Island and east of Florida.

Avenger wreckage mistaken for Flight 19 
In 1986 the wreckage of an Avenger was found off the Florida coast during the search for the wreckage of the Space Shuttle Challenger. Aviation archaeologist Jon Myhre raised this wreck from the ocean floor in 1990. He mistakenly believed it was one of the missing planes.

In 1991 a treasure-hunting expedition led by Graham Hawkes announced that the wreckage of five Avengers had been discovered off the coast of Florida, but their tail numbers revealed they were not Flight 19. In 2004 a BBC documentary showed Hawkes returning with a new submersible 12 years later and identifying one of the planes by its bureau number (a clearly readable 23990) as a flight lost at sea on October 9, 1943, over two years before Flight 19 (its crew all survived), but he was unable to definitively identify the other planes; the documentary concluded that "Despite the odds, they are just a random collection of accidents that came to rest in the same place  from home."

In March 2012 Hawkes was reported as saying it had suited both him (and indirectly his investors) and the Pentagon to make the story go away because it was an expensive and time-consuming distraction, and that, while admitting he had found no conclusive evidence, a statistician he consulted said it was Flight 19.

Records showed training accidents between 1942 and 1945 accounted for the loss of 95 aviation personnel from NAS Fort Lauderdale. In 1992, another expedition located scattered debris on the ocean floor, but nothing could be identified. In the 2000s, searchers expanded their search area farther east, into the Atlantic Ocean, but the remains of Flight 19 have still not been confirmed found.

A 2015 newspaper report claimed a wrecked warplane with two bodies inside was retrieved by the Navy in the mid-1960s near Sebastian, Florida. The Navy initially said it was from Flight 19 but later recanted its statement. Despite Freedom of Information Act requests for details in 2013, the names are still not known because the Navy does not have enough information to identify the bodies.

A wrecked plane found in the Everglades in Broward County was also, incorrectly, postulated to be from Flight 19. In fact this TBN-3E crashed March 16,1947. The crash was reportedly caused by its pilot, Ensign Ralph N. Wachob, developing vertigo. Wachob was killed in the crash.

In fiction 
Flight 19 is featured in the 1977 science-fiction film Close Encounters of the Third Kind. In the film's opening, the aircraft are discovered in the Sonoran Desert, in pristine condition with full fuel tanks, one of several mysterious events that imply extraterrestrial activity. In the film's ending scene, the crew return to Earth from the alien mothership, seemingly the same age as at their disappearance.

Crews of Flight 19 and PBM-5 BuNo 59225

See also 
 List of people who disappeared at sea
 List of missing aircraft

References

External links 

"The Loss Of Flight 19" by the Navy History and Heritage Command
"The Mystery of Flight 19" by Naval Air Station Fort Lauderdale Museum
"The Lost Patrol" a 1982 Flight article

1945 in the United States
Accidents and incidents involving United States Navy and Marine Corps aircraft
Bermuda Triangle
Aviation accidents and incidents in 1945
Military units and formations of the United States Navy
Flights (military unit)
Missing aircraft
Missing aviators
1945 in Florida
December 1945 events in North America
Fort Lauderdale–Hollywood International Airport
1940s United States bomber aircraft
United States Marine Corps in the 20th century